Clay County Courthouse is a historic courthouse located at Brazil, Clay County, Indiana.  It was designed by noted Indiana architect John W. Gaddis and built in 1914 in the Classical Revival style.  It is a three-story, limestone building over a raised basement.  It features a multi-tiered parapet with clock faces within a decorative tympanum and a two-story dome atop the flat roof.  The interior has a rotunda with stained glass octahedral dome.

It was added to the National Register of Historic Places in 1999.

References

County courthouses in Indiana
Courthouses on the National Register of Historic Places in Indiana
Neoclassical architecture in Indiana
Government buildings completed in 1914
Buildings and structures in Clay County, Indiana
National Register of Historic Places in Clay County, Indiana
1914 establishments in Indiana